Mictopsichia misahuallia is a species of moth of the family Tortricidae. It is found in Napo Province, Ecuador.

References

Moths described in 2011
Mictopsichia
Moths of South America
Taxa named by Józef Razowski